Beat Streuli (born 1957) is a Swiss visual artist who works with photo and video based media.

His photographs, videos and window installations have been exhibited in galleries and museums internationally. Permanent installations of his work include those at the Lufthansa Aviation Center, Frankfurt Airport, Germany, the ETH University, Zurich, Switzerland, the Style Company Building, Osaka, Japan, and the immigration hall of Dallas Fort Worth International Airport, Texas, USA.

Life
Streuli was born in 1957 in Altdorf UR. From 1977 to 1983, he attended the Schools of Design in Basel and Zurich and the Hochschule der Künste in Berlin where he lived until 1987. Studio grants followed at Cité des Arts and Fondation Cartier in Paris (1985/1986, 1989 and 1992), at Istituto Svizzero in Rome (1988/1989), in London (1997), and at P.S. 1 in New York City (1993).
Since then Streuli has spent time and worked in cities such as Birmingham, Brussels, Cape Town, New York City and São Paulo, Sydney and Düsseldorf.

Work

Streuli is known for his street portraiture, which has documented the anonymous urban citizen in various cities all over the world, from Sydney and Tokyo to Athens and New York. Streuli's photographs focus systematically on ordinary street dwellers, and the contemporary ‘flaneurs’ going about their daily business. The heterogeneity of the crowd, as the central component of the cultural dynamism of modernity, and the position of the individual in the crowd,  lie at the core of Streuli's practice. He works with a variety of presentation media, from large-format colour photographs, and installations of slide and video projections, to billboards and large-scale window installations on the facades of public buildings.

His camera freezes or distills the flow of everyday life, the movement of people in the city, reflecting on daily reality from an entirely anthropocentric perspective. Photographing with the use of a telephoto lens, Streuli captures his subjects in an unguarded state, bringing them in close proximity to the viewer, lending them an iconic aura which transcends the ordinariness of the scene portrayed. Although they remain anonymous, equal under the lens of the camera, a sense of individual lives and diversity emerges. The viewers are implicated through the shared experience of negotiating public space, the natural state of watching and being scrutinized, of moving and paying attention.

Publications

Publications by Streuli

Publications with contributions by Streuli

Solo exhibitions

[[Image:2003newyork03.jpg|thumb|right|Strangers' 'window installation at International Center of Photography, New York City, 2003]]
 1995: Centre d'Art Contemporain / attitudes, Geneva, Galerie Walcheturm, Zurich, Württembergischer Kunstverein, Stuttgart, Le Consortium, Dijon
 1996: museum in progress, Vienna, Tinglado Dos, Tarragona, ARC, Musée d'Art Moderne de la Ville de Paris, Paris, The New York Kunsthalle, with Adrian Schiess, New York
 1997: Tate Gallery, London
 1998: Museu d'Art Contemporani, Barcelona, Yamaguchi Prefecture Museum, Yamaguchi
 1998: Rencontres d'Arles festival, France
 1999/2000: Museum of Contemporary Art, Chicago, Kunsthalle, Düsseldorf, Kunsthalle, Zurich, Sprengel Museum, Hannover, Spiral Art Center, Tokyo
 2000: Stedelijk Museum, Amsterdam, Galleria Civica d'Arte Moderna e Contemporanea, Torino
 2002: Palais de Tokyo, Paris
 2004: Jablonka Galerie, Cologne, LACE, Los Angeles, Roberts & Tilton Gallery, Los Angeles
 2006: Bunkier Sztuki, Kraków, University of Massachusetts, University Gallery, Amherst, Dogenhaus Galerie, Leipzig, Galerie Wilma Tolksdorf, Berlin
 2007: Galerie Eva Presenhuber, Zurich, Galerie Conrads, Düsseldorf, Museum der bildenden Künste, Leipzig
 2008: Mac's, Musée des Arts Contemporains, Grand-Hornu
 2008: Jordan Festival, billboard installation, Petra
 2008: Elite Runners, South Shields 07,'' Baltic Centre for Contemporary Art, Sage Gateshead, Gateshead, UK
 2010: Galerie Erna Hécey, Brussels, Murray Guy, New York
 2012: Ikon Gallery, Birmingham, UK

References

External links
 
 Beat Streuli, interview with Kate Green

1957 births
Living people
Swiss contemporary artists
Swiss photographers
Street photographers
Swiss video artists
People from the canton of Uri